National Highway 25 (NH 25) is a  National Highway in India that connects Barmer and Beawar in the state of Rajasthan. It has recently been upgraded to four lanes by the National Highways Authority of India.

Route 
Munabao, Ramsar, Barmer, Kawas, Baytu, Madhasar, Dhudhwa, Bagundi, kher, Tilwara, Balotra, Pachpadra, Kalyanpur, Jodhpur, Kaparda, Bilara, Jaitaran, Bar, Beawar.

Junctions  

Terminal with National Highway 70 near Munabao.

Junction with National Highway 925 near Gagriya.

Junction with National Highway 68 near Barmer.

Junction with National Highway 325 near Balotra.

Terminal with National Highway 58 near Beawar.

See also 
List of National Highways in India by highway number

List of National Highways in India by state

References

External links 
 NH 25 on OpenStreetMap

National highways in India
National Highways in Rajasthan